Lisikili is a village in the Zambezi Region in Namibia, found in the Kabbe Constituency, located approximately  northeast of Katima Mulilo. The village has a school called Kasiliki Combined School which recently benefited from a community hostel and a primary health clinic that had only one nurse in October 2012. The furthest home to the clinic is 8 kilometers away. The village has a population of over 2,000.

References 

 Newera.com.na 
 Malarianomore.org.uk

Populated places in the Zambezi Region